Oriskany  may refer to:

Places 

Oriskany, New York, Oneida County
Oriskany Creek, New York
Oriskany Falls, New York, Oneida County
Oriskany, Virginia

Ships 

 
USS Oriskany (CV-34), an aircraft carrier
Oriskany, a fruit cargo ship (see List of shipwrecks of the Isles of Scilly)

Other 

 Battle of Oriskany, American Revolution
 The Ridgeley sandstone of the central Appalachian Mountains in the United States, sometimes called or included in the Oriskany sandstone